T-Force is a 1994 science fiction film directed by Richard Pepin. Set in the near future, its plot concerns a group of law enforcement cyborgs called Cybernauts, which, after being threatened with their shutdown, rebel against their superiors and the authorities.

Plot
A terrorist group led by Sam Washington (Vernon Wells) seizes the British embassy in downtown Los Angeles, killing hostages. All seems lost, but the T-Force, the world's first fully cybernetic law enforcement team is deployed and within minutes, more than thirty terrorists are dead. One member of the T-Force is destroyed Athens (R. David Smith). Upon learning this Adam (Evan Lurie), one of the members of T-Force, goes too far and shoots a disarmed and surrendering female terrorist (Spice Williams-Crosby). He then destroys a terrorist helicopter with six hostages on board including the U.N. Ambassador Chris Olsen (Clement von Franckenstein) with a grenade launcher. Mayor Pendleton (Erin Gray) and Chief Richman (Duke Stroud) of the LAPD decide to shut down the program and disassemble the cybernauts despite protest from the cybernaut's chief scientist Dr. Jon Gant (Martin E. Brooks).

Perceiving their shutdown a threat to their self-preservation, Adam, Mandragora (Jennifer MacDonald) and Zeus (Deron McBee) rebel and go on a killing rampage by targeting the mayor and the chief. Lieutenant Jack Floyd (Jack Scalia) of the LAPD teams up with Cain (Bobby Johnston), one of the cybernauts who chose to obey the law, to hunt down the renegade cybernauts and destroy them.

Cast

Reception

References

External links
 

1990s science fiction films
1994 films
Android (robot) films
American science fiction action films
American robot films
Cyborg films
Films directed by Richard Pepin
Films scored by Louis Febre
1990s English-language films
1990s American films